Schildberg is the former German name of several cities now outside Germany:
 Ostrzeszów, Poland
 Štíty, Czech Republic

Schildberg is also the name of several Ortsteile (roughly, districts) of larger municipalities:
 Schildberg, Gemeinde Böheimkirchen, Austria
 Schildberg, Gemeinde Sankt Paul im Lavanttal, Austria
 Schildberg, Gemeinde Rüting, Germany